619 is a year.

619 may also refer to:
 619 (number)
 Area code 619 in San Diego, California, United States
 Tiger feint kick or 619, a wrestling move used by Rey Mysterio
 USCGC Confidence (WMEC-619), a United States Coast Guard cutter